The term artificial objects is closely associated with man made or not naturally occurring items that have been sent into space.  This is a list of lists of artificial objects in space found on Wikipedia.

:Category:Lists of artificial objects sent into space
:Category:Lists of space missions
Lists of spacecraft
:Category:Lists of spacecraft
List of Solar System probes
List of active Solar System probes
List of space telescopes
:Category:Lists of satellites orbiting earth
List of extraterrestrial orbiters
List of artificial objects in heliocentric orbit, those that orbit the Sun
List of landings on extraterrestrial bodies
List of artificial objects on extra-terrestrial surfaces locations excluding:
List of artificial objects on Venus
List of artificial objects on the Moon
List of artificial objects on Mars
List of artificial objects leaving the Solar System

For the general concept of artificial see Artificiality.
For artificial objects not in space, see :Category:Inventions or List of inventions.

See also
Human presence in space
Timeline of planetary exploration
Timeline of artificial satellites and space probes